Garbini is a surname. Notable people with the surname include:
 Aristide Garbini (1890–1950), Italian film actor
 Michel Garbini Pereira (born 1981), Brazilian football player